The Widow of Saint-Pierre is a 2000 Canadian-French film by Patrice Leconte with Juliette Binoche, Daniel Auteuil and Emir Kusturica. Loosely inspired by an actual case, it tells the story of a disillusioned army officer whose love for his wife in her efforts to save a convicted murderer leads him to disobey orders.

The film made its North American debut at the 2000 Toronto International Film Festival. It was nominated for a Golden Globe Award in 2001 for Best Foreign Language Film and in that year was also nominated for two César Awards.

Plot
In 1849, on the French islands of Saint-Pierre and Miquelon, two rescued sailors get drunk and kill a man. Arrested, tried and sentenced, one dies in custody but the other, Néel, has to wait for his execution because the little islands have no guillotine or executioner.

He is kept in the army barracks under the command of the Captain, who loves and trusts his childless wife known as Madame La. She takes an interest in the  convict and begins to try to redeem him. Under her auspices, Néel works hard, does various good deeds and starts to win the respect of the islanders. The authorities are however adamant that he must die.

A year passes before the authorities hear that an old guillotine is on its way from the island of Martinique. By that time Néel is a changed man, who has learned to read and has even become a father after a quick encounter with a young widow whose roof he was mending. To the fury of the authorities, the Captain gets a priest into the barracks to marry the pair.

When the ship with the guillotine eventually approaches, its rudder is broken and the island's men are asked to tow it inshore in rowing boats, one being Néel. Seeing how powerfully he rows, Madame La fills a boat with food and tells him to escape in it to the British island of Newfoundland. He however returns to his cell.

As none of the islanders will take the job of executioner, a new arrival is made to accept the task or face deportation. The Captain then tells the authorities that he will not order his soldiers to fire on inhabitants who obstruct the execution. For this disobedience, he is placed aboard a warship to be taken back to France for court-martial and Madame La joins him.

The Captain is condemned to death and shot by a firing squad. Back on Saint-Pierre, the old guillotine fails to work and they have to cut Néel's head off with an axe.

Cast
 Juliette Binoche as Madame La
 Daniel Auteuil as The Captain
 Emir Kusturica as Néel 
 Michel Duchaussoy as The Governor
 Philippe Magnan as Council Chairman
 Christian Charmetant as Naval Officer
 Philippe Du Janerand as Customs Chief

Awards and nominations
 2001 César Awards
 Nominated for Best Actress – Juliette Binoche
 Nominated for Best Supporting Actor – Emir Kusturica
 Golden Globe Awards 2001
 Nominated for Best Foreign Language Film
 Sant Jordi Awards 2001
 Winner Best Foreign Actor – Daniel Auteuil
 22nd Moscow International Film Festival
 Winner Russian Film Critics Award – Best Film
 Nominated for Golden Saint George Award
Jutra Awards 2001
 Nominated for Best Art direction

Production notes
Though set in the French colony of St Pierre and Miquelon, the movie was filmed in the restored Fortress of Louisbourg on Cape Breton Island, Nova Scotia.
The French title La Veuve de Saint-Pierre contains wordplay. "Veuve" translates to "Widow". In the 19th century the word was also slang for a guillotine.

Notes

References

External links
Official website
 
 

2000 films
2000s French-language films
Films about capital punishment
Films directed by Patrice Leconte
Saint Pierre and Miquelon culture
Films set in the 1850s
Lionsgate films
Films shot in Nova Scotia
Canadian films based on actual events
Canadian drama films
French drama films
French-language Canadian films
2000s Canadian films
2000s French films